The Specials is a 2000 American superhero comedy film directed by Craig Mazin and written by James Gunn. It stars an ensemble cast, featuring Thomas Haden Church, James Gunn, Rob Lowe, Jamie Kennedy, Judy Greer, Sean Gunn, Paget Brewster, Jordan Ladd, Jim Zulevic and Kelly Coffield.

The film follows a group of ordinary superheroes on their day off. According to the film, the Specials are the sixth or seventh most popular group of superheroes in the world. Unlike most superhero films, The Specials has almost no action and few special effects; instead it focuses on the average day-to-day lives of the heroes.

Plot
The superhero team the Specials has never achieved great popularity or prestige, partially because unlike other super teams it is not corporation-friendly and has been unable to  secure merchandising deals. Without the corporate or private financial resources of more well-established teams, the Specials often get underrated villains, small disasters, and the occasional alien invasion to repel — all of which are deemed too low-priority for other superhero teams. Even the members with formidable  powers have shortcomings that prevented a transition for the team as a whole. Because team-members such as the Strobe, Ms. Indestructible, The Weevil, Deadly Girl, Power Chick, Amok, Alien Orphan, and Eight all possess various social dysfunctions, they've never quite broken through the superhero glass ceiling.

The team welcomes Nightbird (Jordan Ladd), the group's newest member, a teenage girl with "bird powers." Nightbird, who idolizes the Specials, soon realizes that her heroes do not function as a harmonious team but like a dysfunctional family. One of the two greatest points of stress in the team is the slowly fracturing relationship between the Strobe (Thomas Haden Church) and Ms. Indestructible (Paget Brewster), a married couple at the core of the team. Also problematic is that the Weevil is trying to negotiate an exit into a more high-profile superhero team, playing both on his own popularity and his legacy status from following in his father's footsteps.

The cracks begin to show as they prepare to attend a dinner in their honor thrown by Kosgrov Toys, which is releasing a line of action figures based upon the group. The event is a travesty. It becomes quickly apparent that Kosgrov did little research on the Specials, and low-balled the production by utilizing cheap accessories and recycled parts.  Worse yet, the leader of the Specials, the Strobe, discovers that his wife, Ms. Indestructible, is cheating on him with the most popular member of the group, The Weevil (Rob Lowe). In a fit of anger, the Strobe disbands the group, and the members go their own ways.

The Strobe goes to Zip Boy's (Barry Del Sherman) house and asks for a job at New Standards Inc., a plastics company in Detroit, denying there's a problem by saying that he's great, now that he has "a great new job as a welding asshole." Ms. Indestructible spends the night watching her old wedding video and crying over a glass of wine.  The Strobe's brother, Minute Man (James Gunn), who had had a crush on the new girl, Nightbird, ultimately falls into the arms of Deadly Girl (Judy Greer), who, because of her loyalty to the Strobe as leader, was hurt to learn about Weevil and Ms. Indestructible. Meanwhile, Amok (Jamie Kennedy), Power Chick (Kelly Coffield), Alien Orphan (Sean Gunn), and Mr. Smart (Jim Zulevic) indulge in a night of drinking and dancing.

During the disbandment, the Weevil finalizes his transfer to another superhero team, only to find that his negative press from the Specials still follows him. Reporters focus more on his controversy than his ability to apprehend villains, and the Weevil finds he has gone from being the top dog in a small team to the team runt in the larger one. The Strobe and Ms. Indestructible reconcile, and the Strobe renews his passion for justice instead of image.  The team is immediately called back into action and the heroes resolve to do the right thing not because it will bring popularity or glory, but because as misfits, they've become the champions of society's underdogs.  They exit to face down another crisis, giant ants attacking the White House; as they assemble, they actively demonstrate their powers for the first time in the entire film.

Cast
Thomas Haden Church as Ted Tilderbrook / The Strobe: The leader of the group. He founded the Specials along with his brother Minute Man, the Weevil, Ms. Indestructible, and Stretchie Boy. He has the ability to shoot laser beams out of his arms and possesses a big ego.
Paget Brewster as Emily Tilderbrook / Ms. Indestructible: The Strobe's wife and secretary. She acts as a sort of office manager or accountant for the group. She has indestructible skin ("that can withstand a nuclear blast") and cannot be injured anywhere but her eyes. She has an affair with The Weevil.
James Gunn as Tim Tilderbrook / Minute Man: The Strobe's brother. He has the ability to shrink himself to a small size (about 5 inches on average). He is irritated by people constantly mispronouncing his name and mistaking him for a minuteman. He is also self-conscious about his uniform making him look gay.
Rob Lowe as Tony / The Weevil: The most popular member of the group, he inherited his codename and powers from his father. He has enhanced abilities proportionate to that of an insect, though only "weevil agility" is specifically named. He is having an affair with Ms. Indestructible. He also longs to leave The Specials and join the substantially more popular Crusaders.
Kelly Coffield as Nancy / Power Chick: An outgoing lesbian with the ability to change her body into any material with which she comes in contact. She considers herself to be Alien Orphan's guardian.
Sean Gunn as Doug / Alien Orphan: An alien who crash-landed on Earth. He can shape-shift, but often has trouble communicating. He is cared for by Power Chick.
Judy Greer as Deadly Girl: A young woman who has the ability to enter the "world of the dead" and travel through it, reappearing anywhere she chooses. She can also summon demons to do her bidding, something she says "makes [one] feel good about [oneself]". 
Jim Zulevic as Seymour / Mr. Smart: A man claiming to be the smartest on Earth. He is an inventor of gadgets such as a smile machine and a device that amplifies his sense of smell 3,000 times. The Weevil refers to Mr. Smart as a "washout" who contributes little to the team.
Jordan Ladd as Shelly / Nightbird: The team's newest member, a teen with very sensitive hearing, an affinity with birds, and the ability to lay eggs, each of which contain a different weapon. 
Jamie Kennedy as Amok: A former super-villain with blue skin and the ability to manipulate antimatter. He is extremely vulgar, preoccupied with sex, and, at one time, jailed after capture by rival superhero group The Crusaders.
John Doe, Brian Gunn, Lauren Cohn, Chuti Tiu, Abdul Salaam El Razzac, Tom Dorfmeister, Johann Stauf and Samantha Cannon as Eight: Believed to be the result of a CIA experiment, this hero simultaneously operates eight separate human bodies; allowing him to be in several places at once and receive mixed sensory input. The bodies also span multiple genders and ethnicities. Eight, by his own admission, is passive until required to act.
Barry Del Sherman as Jerry / Zip Boy: Former group member who quit to become an entrepreneur. His business is finding "normal" job placements for superheroes. As the name might imply, he possesses super-speed - he can run from Yemen to Bel-air in 28 minutes.
Mike Schwartz as U.S. Bill: Superhero of limited intelligence but super-human strength.  He is extremely obsessed with keeping his identity secret, and lives at home with his mother.
Taryn Manning as Autograph Hound
Jenna Fischer as College Girl
Melissa Joan Hart as Sunlight Grrrll
Michael Weatherly as Verdict
Judith Drake as Verdict's Secretary

Production 
James Gunn wrote the movie in a span of two to three weeks. He gave the script to his brother Sean who passed it to Jamie Kennedy who shared it with his manager who then signed  Gunn as a client.

The film was released on Blu-Ray for its 20th anniversary in 2020.

Critical reception 
The website's consensus reads, "Clever, funny, and exciting." Metacritic gave the film a weighted average score of 38 out of 100, based on 8 critics, indicating "generally unfavorable reviews".

Horrornews.net stated: "The film is simply dumb fun or has fun being dumb. Not every gag is funny, however the idea and execution is really what makes it a treat.”

References

External links

2000 films
American comedy films
2000 comedy films
American independent films
American superhero films
2000s superhero comedy films
2000 independent films
Films with screenplays by James Gunn
2000s English-language films
2000s American films